The 2018 COSAFA Cup was the 18th edition of the COSAFA Cup, an international football competition consisting of national teams of member nations of the Council of Southern Africa Football Associations (COSAFA).  In July 2017, it was reported that it would be hosted by Botswana in July 2018. However, in February 2018, COSAFA announced that South Africa would host the competition.

Venues

Draw

The draw took place at the South African Football Association headquarters in Johannesburg on 18 April.

Officials

Referees
 Thando Ndzandzeka (South Africa)
 Nomore Musundire (Zimbabwe)
 Hélder Martins De Carvalho (Angola)
 Bernard Camille (Seychelles)
 Ahmad Imtehaz Heeralall (Mauritius)
 Jackson Pavaza (Namibia)
 Hamada Nampiandraza (Madagascar)
 Tirelo Mositwane  (Botswana)
 Celso Alvação (Mozambique)

Assistant Referees

 James Emile (Seychelles)
 Souru Phatsoane (Lesotho)
 Athenkosi Ndongeni (South Africa)
 Mervyn Van Wyk (South Africa)
 Sifiso Nxumalo (Swaziland)
 Matheus Kanyanga (Namibia)
 Romeo Kasengele (Zambia)
 Fabien Cauvelet (Mauritius)
 Clemence Kanduku (Malawi)

Group stage

Tiebreakers
The ranking of each team in each group was determined as follows:
Greatest number of points obtained in group matches
Goal difference in all group matches
Greatest number of goals scored in all group matches

Group A

Group B

Knockout stage

Quarter-finals

Semi-finals

Third-placed playoff

Final

Plate

Semi-finals

Final

References

External links
Official site

2018
2018 in African football
International association football competitions hosted by South Africa
2017–18 in South African soccer
COSAFA Cup
COSAFA Cup